The 1961 Howard Bulldogs football team was an American football team that represented Howard College (now known as the Samford University) as an independent during the 1961 NCAA College Division football season. In their third year under head coach Bobby Bowden, the team compiled an 7–2 record.

Schedule

References

Howard
Samford Bulldogs football seasons
Howard Bulldogs football